Javier Martín Zambrano Elizondo (born 3 November 1962) is a Mexican politician affiliated with the National Action Party. As of 2014 he served as Deputy of the LX Legislature of the Mexican Congress representing Nuevo León.

References

1962 births
Living people
Politicians from Nuevo León
National Action Party (Mexico) politicians
21st-century Mexican politicians
Deputies of the LX Legislature of Mexico
Members of the Chamber of Deputies (Mexico) for Nuevo León